'Chris Christofi is a ' Greek-Australian entrepreneur, sporting director and sports sponsor who is the founder and CEO of Reventon and CHC Planning Solutions. Since 2010, he has been the major sponsor of cue sports, is the director of the Reventon Snooker Academy and also created the Reventon Triple Crown.

Aside from this, Chris is an author of best-selling book, Your Path To Wealth: Brick By Brick, and the host of RELENTLESS: Life on Your Terms podcast.

Biography 
Chris was born in Melbourne, Australia to Greek-Cypriot parents and is the youngest of four children. He spent his early years in Cyprus.

In 1988, he along with family, moved back to Cyprus, when he was 9 years old. At the age 10, he started selling lottery tickets on the streets of Cyprus and working 10-hour shifts at his father's supermarket on the weekends and school holidays.

Chris has pursued cue sports such as snooker and billiards; combat sports such as kickboxing and boxing, and poker as a hobby . At the age of 16, he returned to Melbourne and started playing snooker at Brunswick Club and later represented Victoria nationally. He has competed in kickboxing where he had seven fights.

Career 
At the age of 19, he began working for a property market development company and later bought his first property with the help of his parents. Later, he formed a business partnership in Queensland and was working on expanding it. By the age of 24, he owned twenty-four investment properties. Somehow, the  business collapsed and left Chris in a massive debt of $780,000. After the debacle, he sold all of his properties and moved back to his parents home. At the same time, his eldest son became deaf after a long battle with meningitis and he split with his partner.

In 2005, Chris was under a debt of $348,000. At this stage, he started a new company, Reventon, and opened its first office in the lounge room of his parents' home. Due to his efforts and hard work, Reventon later became a leading investment and financial services company and currently manages more than $1 billion in real estate transactions.
In 2015, he co-founded CHC Planning Solutions along with Christopher Stylianou and Harris Hadjiharalambous.

In September 2019, he started a new podcast named RELENTLESS: Life On Your Terms. He also published his best-selling book, Your Path To Wealth: Brick By Brick in 2019. In the year, he was appointed as one of the top 100 young entrepreneurs in Australia and won the Melbourne Young Entrepreneur Awards 2019 in the category Finance.

Contribution to cue sports 
Chris has been a major contributor to the sport of snooker and billiard as a player, administrator, and sponsor.

He started playing snooker at the age of 14 when he lived in Cyprus. He returned to Australia when he was 16 and started playing for Brunswick where he was promoted to A grade. Later, he competed in the Australian U18 and U21 national tournaments, representing Victoria alongside his friends Neil Robertson and James Mifsud. He has won snooker events, including Vic Minors and has played in the quarter-finals of open snooker events.

In 2010, at a time when the sport was declining, Chris started sponsoring the Australian Billiards and Snooker Council (ABSC)  and also saw the creation of its own ranking system, named the Reventon Ranking  system.
Due to Chris continued support and financial contributions to the Yarraville Billiards and Snooker Club (YBSC) and Victoria Billiards and Snooker Association (VBSA), the YBSC club was renamed to the Reventon Snooker Academy.

In 2016, the ABSC honoured Chris with the creation of the Reventon Triple Crown, a series of tournaments which combine Reventon Masters, the Reventon Classic and the Reventon International, and are the highest prized tournaments held in Melbourne, Australia.

In 2020, the Reventon Triple Crown received international coverage with 278 entries and a disclosed $135,700 AUD in prize payouts. Part of the funds raised for the tournament were donated to the White Ribbon Foundation. In the same year, the ABSC President, Frank Dewens, awarded Chris for his recognition of his outstanding contribution to the sport.

Philanthropy 
Chris is passionate about philanthropy and giving back to the community. He has sponsored charitable initiatives such as White Ribbon Australia, Expression Australia, World Vision. He is a major contributor to Vinnies CEO Sleepout, a charity which raises awareness regarding homelessness.

In June 2018, Chris began his philanthropic work with Vinnies CEO Sleepout to make a difference and started by raising a total of $40,185 to which he personally contributed $10,000.

After a successful 2018, in 2019 he continued his support for the charity and raised a total of $60,564 with Chris donating 50 cents to every dollar raised, donating approximately $20,000. In the same year, Chris' philanthropic work was recognised when Vinnies appointed him a Vinnies CEO Sleepout ambassador.
In 2019, saw Vinnies break their own record by raising $7.8 million for the respective charity. Chris again pledged to raise the bar the following two years to raise $80,000 and $100,000 respectively.

In the same year, 'Brick by Brick' fund-raising project was created. He purchased a vacant block of land in Mt. Duneed in order to build a home, and later sold the property, in order to support people experiencing homelessness and poverty in Australia. In addition, every property sale through his company Reventon, $500 from the sale is also donated towards the 'Brick by Brick' fund-raising project.

In 2020, Chris partnered up with Matthew Charles from We Gift Rap by creating a song targeting homelessness and raising awareness. With strict lockdown rules limiting sleepout, Chris slept on the streets of Melbourne on two consecutive nights in June along with his wife. He raised a total of $82,177, with Chris and his company Reventon donating 75 cents of every dollar raised, totalling $38,000.

In 2021, he collaborated with Matthew Charles again to recreate an acoustic version, which featured special guest, Andrew Loadsman. To raise awareness, Chris again took to the streets of Melbourne and slept outside. This year, he raised $113,173 in donations, in which he donated $1 to every $1 raised, totaling contributing $56,500.

So far in 2022, Chris once again teamed up with Matt Charles along with Andrew Loadsman and recorded a studio version of the charity anthem “A Little Means A Lot”.
He hosted his Inaugural live Lead With Kindness event, raising an incredible $50,000 to donate towards his 2022 Vinnies CEO Sleep Out fund.
He also completed his 5th Vinnies CEO Sleep Out, raising a total of $263,096.

Personal life 
Chris is married to Billie and is father to four children, Alec, Gisele, Penelope, and Mila.

Awards and recognition 
Chris has won over 30 awards, mentioned below are a few:
Rookie Of The Year Award 2002 No Limit Lifestyle Investments
 Contribution to Australian Snooker Appreciation Award from ABSC for 2020
Tycoon Of The Year Award JT Foxx Mega Success 2018
 Innovation Award Winner Console 2022 - Reventon Residential
 Choice Platinum Achiever Award (2018-2021)
 Business News Young Entrepreneur of the Year for Financial Services (2018)
 Business News Young Entrepreneur of the Year for Financial Services (2019)
 Australia's top 100 entrepreneurs (2018)
 Australia's top 100 entrepreneurs (2019)

Chris, his wife Billie and Reventon have featured on many publications, including Herald Sun, Sky News Australia, Channel 9, Channel 10, Channel 7, ABC, NewsCorp, Australian Financial Review.

Published works

Books 
 Christofi, Chris (2019). Your Path To Wealth: Brick By Brick

Audiobooks 
 Your Path To Wealth: Brick By Brick

See also
 Reventon Triple Crown

References

External links 
 Chris Christofi official website
 Reventon 
 CHC Planning Solutions

Australian businesspeople
Year of birth missing (living people)
Living people